The FIM Supermoto of Nations, is an annual supermoto event since 2006 organized by the International Motorcycling Federation (FIM). The championship has been won by France eleven times.

Medallists

References

Supermoto, Team
Recurring sporting events established in 2006